Stavros George Livanos (1891– May 28, 1963), was a Greek shipowner, native of Chios, and the founder of the Livanos shipping empire. He was also a rival as well as father-in-law to billionaire Greek shipping tycoons Aristotle Onassis and Stavros Niarchos.

Early life 
Livanos was born on Chios, then part of the Ottoman Empire, a third-generation sailor. The third of four sons of steamship owner George Livanos, he turned the outbreak of the First World War into opportunities. Even during the postwar demise of the shipping boom, Livanos managed to stay on top by investing only with cash instead of credit. He was notoriously tight with his money, a claim that the late Stavros Niarchos remembered as accurate., Confirming his reputation for high cash-investment in his ships, Livanos once said, "I have no money. I have ships."

Marriage and descendants 

 In 1924, he married Arietta Zafirakis (1909–1986) and had three children.
Eugenia Livanos, married Stavros Niarchos in 1947.
 Philip Niarchos (born 1954), billionaire art collector. Married Victoria Christina Guinness.
 Stavros Niarchos II (born 1985). In 2019, he married Dasha Zhukova, in a civil ceremony in Paris.
 Eugenie Niarchos (born 1986), a jewellery designer.
 Theodorakis Niarchos (born 1991)
 Electra Niarchos (born 1995)
 Spyros Stavros Niarchos (born 1955). He was married to Daphne Guinness.
 Nicolas Stavros Niarchos (born 1989)
 Alexis Spyros Niarchos (born 1991) 
 Ines Sophia Niarchos (born 1995)
 Maria Isabella Niarchos (born 1959). Married firstly Alix Chevassus, and then Stephane Gouazé.
 Athur Gouazé
 Mia Gouazé
 Constantin Niarchos (1962-1999). Married firstly Alessandra Borghese, of the Borghese family and then Sylvia Martins.
 Athina Mary Livanos (1929–1974), married firstly Aristotle Onassis, secondly John Spencer-Churchill, 11th Duke of Marlborough and thirdly Stavros Niarchos (her former brother in law).
 Alexander Onassis (1948-1973). Died in a plane crash.
 Christina Onassis (1950-1988). Married firstly Joseph Bolker, secondly Alexandros Andreadis, thirdly Sergei Kauzov and finally Thierry Roussel.
 Athina Onassis (born 1985), married Álvaro de Miranda Neto.
 George Stavros Livanos (born 1934), married Lita Voivoda in 1966, in London.
 Marina Livanos, married Andreas Martinos, heir to the ship management company Thenamaris.
 Andreas-Ioannis Martinos
 Stavros Livanos.
 Aritta Livanos, married Giorgios Vardinoyannis.
 Eugenie Livanos, married Nicholas Clive-Worms, heir to the Banque Worms fortune.
 Christina Livanos

The Livanos family lived in London most of the time. It was in London during the First World War that Livanos built the foundation of his empire. Yet they also had a lavish villa, known as Bella Vista, on Chios.

Notes

External links 
 Obituary for Arietta Zafirakis Livanos
 The Life of Stavros Livanos

1891 births
1963 deaths
Greek businesspeople in shipping
Livanos family
Businesspeople from Chios